Chapel No. 1 or Eisenhower Memorial Chapel is a historic chapel located at the former Lowry Air Force Base in Denver, Colorado, United States.  Built in 1941, it was listed on the National Register of Historic Places in 1982.

References

Properties of religious function on the National Register of Historic Places in Colorado
National Register of Historic Places in Denver
Military chapels
Chapels in the United States
Churches completed in 1941
20th-century churches in the United States
Churches in Denver